Garra bicornuta, the Tunga garra, is a small species of ray-finned fish in cyprinid family from rivers in the Western Ghats in India.

References 

Garra
Taxa named by C. R. Narayan Rao
Fish described in 1920